Kiskunfélegyháza is a city in Bács-Kiskun County, Hungary.A

Geography
M5 motorway, Highway 5, 451, Budapest–Cegléd–Szeged railway line and railway lines to Szolnok, Kiskunhalas and Szentes also cross the town. The surrounding country is covered with vineyards, fruit gardens, and tobacco and corn fields.

Name
Félegyháza means "half church" in Hungarian, while prefix Kiskun refers to the region Kiskunság ("Little Cumania").

History

Numerous Roman urns and other ancient relics have been dug up in the vicinity.

Conquering Hungarians arrived in the 9th century, adopted Christianity and settled down in the region by the 10th century. The first settlements devastated by the Mongols in 1241–42, the region became uninhabited. King Béla IV invited Cuman settlers, who also adopted Christianity, farming lifestyle and the Hungarian language. The town was existing in 1389 when a document mentions Feledház, an earlier name for the settlement. The town was ruined in 1526 by Ottoman troops and was uninhabited until the Christian troops liberated the area.

Kiskunfélegyháza was reestablished by Roman Catholic Hungarian settlers from Jászfényszaru and Üllés in 1743. Queen Maria Theresa moved the courts and prisons for the Kiskun district to Kiskunfélegyháza in 1753 and granted town privileges also in 1774.

Notable people
Ferenc Móra (1879–1934), novelist
Béla Magyari (1949–2018), cosmonaut
Sándor Petőfi (1823–1849), national poet
László Réczi (1947), wrestler
Csaba Szűcs (1965), athlete
Gyula Zsivótzky (1937–2007), athlete

Twin towns – sister cities

Kiskunfélegyháza is twinned with:

 Bagnols-sur-Cèze, France
 Braunfels, Germany
 Corund, Romania
 Die, France
 Feltre, Italy
 Jászfényszaru, Hungary
 Kikinda, Serbia
 Rabka-Zdrój, Poland
 Sighișoara, Romania

 Turda, Romania
 Uhrovec, Slovakia

References

External links

 in Hungarian

Populated places in Bács-Kiskun County
Towns in Hungary